Sar is a surname. Notable people with the surname include:

Abdoulaye Sar
Edwin van der Sar  (born 1970), Dutch association football goalkeeper
Franco Sar (1933–2018), Italian Olympic decathlete
Maya Sar (born 1981), Bosnian singer-songwriter
Nikhilananda Sar (born 1936), Indian politician
 Pol Pot (1925–1998, born Saloth Sar), Cambodian dictator